The 1st annual Berlin International Film Festival was held from 6 to 17 June 1951 at the Titiana-Palast cinema. The opening film was Alfred Hitchcock's Rebecca. At this very first Berlin Festival, the Golden Bear award was introduced, and it was awarded to the best film in each of five categories: drama, comedy, crime or adventure, music film, and documentary. This system disappeared already the following year because FIAPF (Federation Internationale des Associations des Producteurs de Films) stated that the awarding of prizes by an expert jury was reserved for "A-festivals" only. Instead, the next year's festival awards were voted on by the audience.

Jury
The following people from West Germany were announced as being on the jury for the festival:
 Fritz Podehl, playwright and producer - Jury President
 Johannes Betzel, cinema owner
 Emil Dovifat, professor of political journalism
 Werner Eisbrenner, composer and conductor
 Günther Geisler, journalist and critic
 Walter Karsch, critic and publisher
 Hilde Lucht-Perske, city councilor
 Tatjana Sais, actress
 Paul Heimann, pedagogue and reader 
 Johannes Betzel, cinema operator

Films in competition
The following films were in competition for the Golden Bear awards:

Key
{| class="wikitable" width="550" colspan="1"
| style="background:#FFDEAD;" align="center"| †
|Winner of the main award for best film in its section
|-
| colspan="2"| The opening and closing films are screened during the opening and closing ceremonies respectively.
|}

Awards
The following prizes were awarded by the Jury:

West German jury
 Golden Bear
 Die Vier im Jeep by Leopold Lindtberg – Golden Bear for Best Drama
 ...Sans laisser d'adresse by Jean-Paul Le Chanois – Golden Bear for Best Comedy
 In Beaver Valley by James Algar – Golden Bear for Best Documentary
 Justice est faite by André Cayatte – Golden Bear for Best Crime or Adventure Film
 Cinderella by Wilfred Jackson  – Golden Bear for Best Music Film
Silver Bear
 Il cammino della speranza  – Silver Bear for Best Drama
 Leva på 'Hoppet' – Silver Bear for Best Comedy
 The Tales of Hoffmann – Silver Bear for Best Music film
Bronze Bear
 The Undefeated – Bronze Bear for Best Documentary
 The Browning Version – Bronze Bear for Best Drama
 The Mating Season – Bronze Bear for Best Comedy
 Destination Moon – Bronze Bear for Best Crime or Adventure Film
Golden Medal
 Kleine Nachtgespenster – Golden Medal for Best Culture Films and Documentaries
 Der Film entdeckte Kunstwerke indianischer Vorzeit – Golden Medal for Best Arts and Science Film
 The Story of Time – Golden Medal for Best Advertising Film
Silver Medal
 Begone Dull Care – Silver Medal for Best Culture Films and Documentaries
 Goya – Silver Medal for Best Arts and Science Film
 Het gala-Concert – Silver Medal for Best Advertising Film
Bronze Medal
 Der gelbe Dom – Bronze Medal for Best Culture Films and Documentaries
 Bosch – Bronze Medal for Best Arts and Science Film
 Blick ins Paradies – Bronze Medal for Best Advertising Film

Audience Vote
Large Bronze plate – Cinderella 
Small Bronze plate – The Browning Version

Special Prize of the city of  West Berlin
Special prize for an excellent Film Achievement – Il Christo probito 
Special prize for an excellent Film Achievement – God Needs Men 
Certificate of Honour – Dr. Holl

References

External links
 Berlin International Film Festival 1951: Inaugural Ceremony
1951 Berlin International Film Festival
Berlin International Film Festival:1951  at Internet Movie Database

01
1951 film festivals
1951 in West Germany
1950s in Berlin